Michael Eastwood  is a mathematician at the University of Adelaide, known for his work in twistor theory, conformal differential geometry and invariant differential operators. In 1976 he received a PhD at Princeton University in several complex variables under Robert C. Gunning. He was a member of the twistor research group of Roger Penrose at the University of Oxford and he coauthored the monograph The Penrose Transform: Its Interaction with Representation Theory with Robert Baston. After moving to South Australia in 1985 he was the 1992 recipient of the Australian Mathematical Society Medal and made a Fellow of the Australian Academy of Science in 2005. In 2012 he was named to the inaugural (2013) class of fellows of the American Mathematical Society.

References 

Academic staff of the University of Adelaide
Australian mathematicians
Princeton University alumni
Fellows of the American Mathematical Society
Fellows of the Australian Academy of Science
Year of birth missing (living people)
Living people